is a role-playing video game developed by imageepoch and published by Marvelous Entertainment. In Luminous Arc 3, witches have ceased to exist, but their legacy lives on through "Magi". There are two people who are associated with witches. One is Sarah, who wants to become the legendary witch and the Holy Witch Sylvia.

Gameplay
Luminous Arc 3 follows the base gameplay of the previous games of the series with few improvements.

Plot

Story
The Royal Kingdom of Saint Bardia had been in peace for a thousand years. People thank the Holy Knight Anogia and the legendary Holy Witch Sylvia, which saved the world once. A war between humans and the Felicias (a species of fairy) has started. They fight for the power of Eyes that provides magical powers.

References

External links
Official Japanese Website 

2009 video games
Fantasy video games
Marvelous Entertainment
Nintendo DS games
Nintendo DS-only games
Role-playing video games
Video games developed in Japan
Image Epoch games
Video games about witchcraft
Japan-exclusive video games
Luminous Arc
Multiplayer and single-player video games